Harry Waldau (born Valentin Pinner) (1876–1943), born in Liegnitz, Germany, was murdered in the Auschwitz concentration camp.

He was a Jewish pianist, composer and lyricist and part of the 1920s cabaret scene in Berlin, writing songs like Savannah Tango, Mensch komm mal rüber, Warum kiekste mir denn immer uff die Beene and Die Tausend-Kronen-Note for singer Claire Waldoff. Konrad Tom wrote Polish words for Waldau's Madame Loulou and Adam Aston performed it.

Waldau was deported on 2 March 1943 from Berlin on Transport 32 and murdered in Auschwitz later that month.

Waldau also composed the music for the 1930 film Retreat on the Rhine.

References

External links
 
 Yad Vashem Central Database of Shoah Victims

Jewish songwriters
German cabaret performers
1943 deaths
1876 births
German people who died in Auschwitz concentration camp
German Jews who died in the Holocaust